André Melançon (February 18, 1942 - August 23, 2016) was a Canadian actor, screenwriter and film director, best known for directing and writing several installments in the Tales for All series of children's films.

Career
The versatile André Mélançon – director, writer and actor – set out to become a youth guidance counsellor before he veered into film. His background in psychology and education helped orient his filmmaking toward films about, with, and for children. His first film was on Quebec separatist Charles Gagnon, then at the request of producer Jean Dansereau he directed a trio of short films for children in the early 1970s that confirmed the direction of his career. He turned to acting and won a Canadian Film Award for his performance in Bound for Glory (Partis pour la gloire). In the 1980s he directed The Dog Who Stopped the War, which won the Golden Reel Award, and Bach et bottine, and wrote, with Jacques Bobet, Tadpole and the Whale also a Golden Reel Award winner.

In 2012 Mélançon received the Prix Albert-Tessier, given to him by the Quebec government for his esteemed career in Quebec cinema.  In 2013 he was awarded the National Order of Quebec and in 2015 he received the Lifetime Achievement Jutra-Award.

Filmography

Actor

Director

References

External links

Canadian male film actors
Canadian male television actors
Canadian screenwriters in French
Film directors from Quebec
Male actors from Quebec
People from Rouyn-Noranda
1942 births
2016 deaths
Canadian television directors
Best Actor Genie and Canadian Screen Award winners
Prix Albert-Tessier winners